Igor Vladimirovich Malakhov (15 September 1979 – 4 November 2018) was a Russian professional football player.

Club career
He played for the main squad of FC Dynamo Stavropol in the Russian Cup. He played in the Russian Football National League for FC Uralan Elista in 2004.

References

1979 births
Sportspeople from Stavropol
2018 deaths
Russian footballers
Association football goalkeepers
FC Dynamo Stavropol players
FC Elista players
FC Metallurg Lipetsk players
FC Spartak Kostroma players